Allan Bower (born March 7, 1995) is an American artistic gymnast. A member of the United States men's national gymnastics team, he represented the United States at the 2018 American Cup and the 2017 Cottbus World Cup. Domestically, he finished second in the all-around at the 2017 U.S. National Gymnastics Championships and third at the 2018 U.S. National Gymnastics Championships. Bower was a member of the Oklahoma Sooners men's gymnastics team from 2014 to 2017, winning three National team titles with the Sooners.

Personal life and education 
Bower was born on March 7, 1995, in Lincoln, Nebraska, to David and Jane Bower (née Clemons). His mother was a gymnast at the University of Nebraska-Lincoln, competing for the Nebraska Cornhuskers women's gymnastics team where she became the 1990 Big 8 all-around champion. He has two younger siblings: Allison and Alex. Allison is a member of the Missouri Tigers gymnastics team, graduating in 2019.

Bower grew up in Chandler, Arizona; he graduated from Basha High School in 2013. At the University of Oklahoma, he majored in Biology and plans to apply to medical school.

Allan Bower is currently married to Morgan Baulier.

Bower has also started his own personal training website with workouts from home.
https://www.bowerpowerfit.com/

References 

1995 births
Living people
Sportspeople from Chandler, Arizona
American male artistic gymnasts
University of Oklahoma alumni